Vladimir Kazimirovich Shileyko (also Shileiko, Shilejko ; February 14, 1891 – October 5, 1930) was a Russian orientalist (assyriologist, hebraist) poet (acmeist) and translator. Shileyko family had roots in the Lithuanian part of the Polish–Lithuanian Commonwealth.

He was a second husband of Russian poet Anna Akhmatova.

He is known for his Russian translations of the Epic of Gilgamesh.

He died in Moscow of tuberculosis.

Russian orientalists
Russian Hebraists
Russian male poets
1891 births
1930 deaths
20th-century Russian translators
20th-century Russian poets
20th-century Russian male writers